The first UNESCO World Heritage Sites on the territory of the present Czech Republic were inscribed at the 16th Session of the World Heritage Committee, held in Santa Fe, United States in 1992, when the country was part of the Czech and Slovak Federative Republic (also known as Czechoslovakia). At this session, three sites were added: the Historic Centre of Prague, the Historic Centre of Český Krumlov and the Historic Centre of Telč.

With the dissolution of Czechoslovakia on January 1, 1993, the country was split into the Czech Republic and Slovakia. The Czech Republic officially adopted the convention on March 26, 1993, inheriting those three sites. , there are 16 sites inscribed on the list and a further 14 on the tentative list. The most recent additions were the three spa towns in the Great Spa Towns of Europe site and the Jizera Mountains forest as an extension to the Ancient and Primeval Beech Forests of the Carpathians and Other Regions of Europe site, both in 2021. Both of these sites are transnational; the Great Spa Towns are shared with six countries and the Ancient and Primeval Beech Forests are shared with 17. The Erzgebirge/Krušnohoří Mining Region is shared with Germany. The Beech Forests are the only natural site in the Czech Republic; the other sites are cultural.

World Heritage Sites
UNESCO lists sites under ten criteria; each entry must meet at least one of the criteria. Criteria i through vi are cultural, and vii through x are natural.

Tentative list
In addition to sites inscribed on the World Heritage List, member states can maintain a list of tentative sites that they may consider for nomination. Nominations for the World Heritage List are only accepted if the site was previously listed on the tentative list. , the Czech Republic recorded 14 sites on its tentative list. The sites, along with the year they were included on the tentative list are:

See also
 Tourism in the Czech Republic

References

External links
 Czech National Commission for UNESCO

 
Czech Republic geography-related lists
Czech Republic
World Heritage Sites